Khalid Hassanali, son of former President of Trinidad and Tobago, Noor Hassanali, was the president at Petrotrin from May 2012 to October 2015. 

Hassanali has three children: Behzad, Faria Hassanali-Badaloo with his wife Rehanna and Aadam with his previous wife Sheila.

References

Trinidad and Tobago businesspeople
Trinidad and Tobago people of Indian descent
Year of birth missing (living people)
Living people
University of the West Indies alumni
Alumni of the University of London
Trinidad and Tobago chemical engineers